Stroh is an unincorporated community in Milford Township, LaGrange County, Indiana, USA.

The Stroh post office was established in 1900.

The settlement has five church buildings, Stroh church of God, Stroh church of Christ, Baptist church, Calvary Chapel, Mt Calvery church.

Geography

References

Unincorporated communities in LaGrange County, Indiana
Unincorporated communities in Indiana